Warsaw Township is one of twenty-four townships in Hancock County, Illinois, USA.  As of the 2010 census, its population was 1,607 and it contained 790 housing units.  Since November 15, 1855, the township has been co-extensive with the city of Warsaw.

Geography

Cemeteries
The township contains these three cemeteries: Catholic, Lutheran and Oakland.

Major highways
  Illinois Route 9
  Illinois Route 96

Demographics

School districts
 Nauvoo-Colusa Community Unit School District 325
 Warsaw Community Unit School District 316

Political districts
 Illinois's 18th congressional district
 State House District 94
 State Senate District 47

References
 United States Census Bureau 2008 TIGER/Line Shapefiles
 
 United States National Atlas

External links
 Warsaw Township
 City-Data.com
 Illinois State Archives
 Township Officials of Illinois

Townships in Hancock County, Illinois
Townships in Illinois